Lù Zhì, formerly romanized as Lu Chih (ca. 1496–1576), was a Chinese landscape painter, calligrapher, and poet during the Ming Dynasty (1368–1644).

Lu was born in Suzhou, Jiangsu province. His style name was 'Shuqing' and his sobriquet was 'Bao Shanzi'. Lu's painting followed the style of Wen Zhengming. Lu specialized in both vertical and horizontal landscapes and bird-and-flower paintings.

References

1496 births
1576 deaths
Painters from Suzhou
Ming dynasty landscape painters
16th-century Chinese painters
Ming dynasty calligraphers
Ming dynasty poets
Poets from Jiangsu
Writers from Suzhou